The Chief of the General Staff (Vietnamese: Tổng tham mưu trưởng) is the chief of staff of the General Staff of the People's Army of Vietnam. The Chief of the General Staff performs the task of advising the Minister of Defense in terms of state management and military command. The Chief of the General Staff also serves ex officio as Standing Deputy Minister of Defense. He is appointed by the President of Vietnam, who is the Commander-in-Chief. The current Chief of the General Staff is Colonel General Nguyễn Tân Cương

List of Chiefs of General Staff

Gallery

Chairmen of Chief of Staff by branches of service
 Air Force – 1
 Ground Force – 13
 Navy Force – 0

Notes

References

People's Army of Vietnam
Vietnam